Chariton is a city in, and the county seat of, Lucas County, Iowa, United States. The population was 4,193 at the 2020 census. Lucas is the primary distribution center for and the former corporate headquarters of the Hy-Vee supermarket chain.

History
Chariton was platted in 1850. Chariton was the name of a French trader.

Hotel Charitone
Designed by local architect William L. Perkins and listed on the National Register of Historic Places for its role in the development of Chariton as a county seat, the Hotel Charitone is listed by the Iowa Historic Preservation Alliance as one of the most endangered sites in Iowa.  The hotel is currently undergoing restoration with the majority of the hotel being converted into apartments.

Geography

The Lucas County Courthouse is the highest point of elevation in the whole town.

Climate

According to the Köppen Climate Classification system, Chariton has a hot-summer humid continental climate, abbreviated "Dfa" on climate maps.

Demographics

2010 census
As of the census of 2010, there were 4,321 people, 1,861 households, and 1,109 families living in the city. The racial makeup of the city was 98.7% White, 0.2% African American, 0.2% Asian, 0.1% Pacific Islander, 0.2% from other races, and 0.6% from two or more races. Hispanic or Latino of any race were 1.2% of the population.

There were 1,861 households, of which 28.6% had children under the age of 18 living with them, 46.1% were married couples living together, 9.6% had a female householder with no husband present, 4.0% had a male householder with no wife present, and 40.4% were non-families. 35.9% of all households were made up of individuals, and 19.1% had someone living alone who was 65 years of age or older. The average household size was 2.28 and the average family size was 2.99.

The median age in the city was 42.1 years. 24.6% of residents were under the age of 18; 7.4% were between the ages of 18 and 24; 21.5% were from 25 to 44; 24.8% were from 45 to 64; and 21.9% were 65 years of age or older. The gender makeup of the city was 47.9% male and 52.1% female.

2000 census
As of the census of 2000, there were 4,573 people, 1,936 households, and 1,192 families living in the city. The racial makeup of the city was 98.88% White, 0.15% African American, 0.09% Native American, 0.15% Asian, 0.26% from other races, and 0.46% from two or more races. Hispanic or Latino of any race were 0.87% of the population.

There were 1,936 households, out of which 27.4% had children under the age of 18 living with them, 49.1% were married couples living together, 9.6% had a female householder with no husband present, and 38.4% were non-families. 34.6% of all households were made up of individuals, and 18.7% had someone living alone who was 65 years of age or older. The average household size was 2.27 and the average family size was 2.92.

Age spread: 24.6% under the age of 18, 7.5% from 18 to 24, 24.8% from 25 to 44, 20.4% from 45 to 64, and 22.6% who were 65 years of age or older. The median age was 40 years. For every 100 females, there were 90.2 males. For every 100 females age 18 and over, there were 81.8 males.

The median income for a household in the city was $27,844, and the median income for a family was $37,935. Males had a median income of $32,265 versus $21,981 for females. The per capita income for the city was $15,553. About 6.6% of families and 12.7% of the population were below the poverty line, including 14.5% of those under age 18 and 10.5% of those age 65 or over.

Education
The Chariton School District is the only school district in the county since 2008, when the Russell School District closed. There are two elementary schools, Columbus Elementary (K-2 grades) and Van Allen Elementary (3–5 grades); one middle school, Chariton Middle School (6–8 grades); and one high school, Chariton High School (9–12).   The high school athletic teams are called the Chargers.

Infrastructure

Transportation

Air Service
Owned by the City of Chariton and located 3 miles west of Chariton on US Highway 34, the Chariton Municipal Airport has served the city and Lucas County since April 1947.

Highways
Chariton is located on   U.S. Route 34, which runs east and west to each side of the state. The city is also served by Iowa Highway 14.

Notable people

Paul Engebretsen, National Football League player
Everett Gendler, rabbi, social activist, and author 
Theodore Heck, Catholic Benedictine priest, academy president, educator
T. J. Hockenson, National Football League player for the Minnesota Vikings
Leo Hoegh, former governor
Lyle Tuttle, tattoo artist and tattoo historian
Mortimer Wilson, composer
Gordon Willey, anthropologist

See also

White Breast Creek

Notes

References

External links

 
Cities in Iowa
Cities in Lucas County, Iowa
County seats in Iowa
1850 establishments in Iowa
Populated places established in 1850